Masquerade in Blood is the seventh studio album by German thrash metal band Sodom, released on 1 June 1995 via Steamhammer/SPV. Musically, Masquerade is often seen as the band's rawest and heaviest record, and continues in the same vein as that of their previous album, but in a more post-thrash fashion.

Overview

The album includes a cover of Anti-Nowhere League song "Let's Break the Law", as well as a cover of Saxon song "20,000 Feet". The latter is only found on the Japanese releases of the album. This is also the only release to feature guitarist Strahli, and the second and last for drummer Atomic Steif, since the former was arrested in 1996 for possession of drugs, while the latter left the band for personal reasons.

Masquerade in Blood continues in the same crossover thrash vein as their previous studio effort Get What You Deserve (which was released in the previous year), however it is most notable for introducing a new groove metal style, with "overwhelming" death metal being present on select songs.

Reception

AllMusic's Eduardo Rivadavia gave the album two stars out of five, noting it as being "something of a return to form" for the band. However, he actually remarked that "such enthusiasm was rather exaggerated", and also criticized it as "a dire listening experience".

Track listing

Personnel

 Sodom
Tom Angelripper – vocals, bass guitar
Strahli – rhythm and lead guitar
Atomic Steif – drums

 Additional personnel
Uli Pösselt – production

Charts

References

1995 albums
Sodom (band) albums
SPV/Steamhammer albums